Leixlip Confey is a railway station in the north-eastern corner of County Kildare, Ireland. It is one of two stations that serve the civil parish of Leixlip, the other being Leixlip Louisa Bridge. Both stations lie on the Dublin to Maynooth commuter route.

Location and access

The station lies at the Captain's Hill end of Leixlip, north of the town centre, and is on the R149 regional road.

Facilities
The station has around 40 paid parking spaces, is wheelchair accessible and has two ticket vending machines.

History
The station was opened on 2 July 1990 as a single platform halt with a portable cabin used as an office. It was upgraded in the early 2000s following a major upgrade of the Western Commuter line.

See also 
 List of railway stations in Ireland
 Rail transport in Ireland

References

External links

 Irish Rail Leixlip (Confey) Station Website

Leixlip
Iarnród Éireann stations in County Kildare
Railway stations opened in 1990
1990 establishments in Ireland
Railway stations in the Republic of Ireland opened in the 20th century